Kosivka is a village in Oleksandriia Raion, Kirovohrad Oblast, Ukraine, located at .

Villages in Oleksandriia Raion